The cycling competitions at the 2019 Southeast Asian Games in Philippines were held in Tagaytay from 1 to 10 December 2019.

Medal table

Medalists

BMX

Mountain biking

Road cycling

References

External links
 

Southeast Asian Games
Southeast Asian Games
Southeast Asian Games
Southeast Asian Games
2019 Southeast Asian Games events
2019